The 2018 Guam gubernatorial election took place on Tuesday, November 6, 2018, to elect the Governor of Guam. Incumbent Republican Governor Eddie Baza Calvo was ineligible for re-election, after his win in 2014, since Guam does not allow governors more than two consecutive terms.  The Governor and Lieutenant Governor of Guam are elected on the same ticket. Five candidates officially declared their bids. After the August 25 primaries, the Republican party nominated Lieutenant Governor Ray Tenorio, while the Democratic party nominated former territorial senator Lou Leon Guerrero. Democratic primary second-placer Frank Aguon Jr. initiated a write-in campaign in hopes of becoming Guam's first write-in elected governor.

Lou Leon Guerrero won the general election with 50.7% of votes, becoming the first female governor in Guamanian history and the first Democrat to win the Governorship of Guam since 1998.

Republican primary

Candidates

Incumbent Lieutenant Governor Ray Tenorio
Lt. Governor Tenorio declared his bid for governor and has chosen former Senator Vicente Anthony "Tony" Ada as his running mate in the upcoming gubernatorial election. The lieutenant governor and former senator officially proclaimed their gubernatorial bid in January, days after election posters of the two were spotted at the Republican Party of Guam headquarters in Maite.
Tenorio, along with Ada, were former senators of the Guam Legislature with Tenorio serving in the 27th-30th legislature and Ada in the 29th-33rd legislature. Ada won his seat in 29th legislature in a special election after the resignation of former Democratic senator Matt Rector.

Results
The Tenorio/Ada ticket was unopposed in the Republican primaries.

Democratic primary
The following candidates have officially declared their bids to run in 2018 Gubernatorial Elections.

Candidates
Sen. Frank B. Aguon, 24th-33rd, currently serving in the 34th Guam Legislature
He announced his bid to be the Governor of Guam in February, just within weeks of winning his ninth legislative term and has chosen the former US attorney for Guam Alicia Limtiaco as his running mate in the primary and general election.
Aguon ran for Lt. Governor in 2006 under the Underwood-Aguon ticket and lost. He later ran again as Lt. Governor in 2010 with former Governor Carl T.C. Gutierrez in which he also lost.

Former Senator Lou Leon Guerrero, 23rd-24th, 26th-28th Guam Legislature
She announced her bid to run for governor in February while attending a wedding at Plaza de España in Hagatña. In a video, she declared her candidacy and chose Joshua "Josh" Tenorio, the new vice president of Guam Autospot, to be her running mate in the 2018 primary and general election.
Leon Guerrero once ran for Lt. Governor under the Ada/Leon Guerrero ticket in the 1998 Democratic primary and lost against the incumbent ticket of Governor Carl T.C. Gutierrez and Lt. Governor Madeleine Z. Bordallo.
Leon Guerrero currently serves as the chair of the board of directors at the Bank of Guam. Josh Tenorio served as the deputy chief of staff under the administration of former governor Carl T.C. Gutierrez, who is running once again for Governor of Guam.

Former Governor Carl T.C. Gutierrez, serving from 1995 to 2003
Governor Gutierrez declared his bid for governor in his home in Agaña Heights. He has selected former Guam Police Department chief Fred Bordallo as his running mate. Bordallo once ran for a seat in the Guam Legislature in 2016 but lost.
He ran again as governor in 2006 under the Gutierrez/Cruz ticket but lost in the primaries against former Delegate Robert A. Underwood and Senator Frank B. Aguon.
He ran once again as Governor of Guam in 2010, with Frank B. Aguon as his running mate. They were narrowly defeated by the Republican Calvo-Tenorio ticket by 487 votes. 
In 2014, former Governor Gutierrez and his running mate Gary Gumataotao ran against the re-election bid of Republican Governor Eddie Baza Calvo and Lt. Governor Ray Tenorio. They later lost the election and gave their support to the re-elected leaders.

Sen. Dennis G. Rodriguez Jr., 31st-33rd, currently serving in the 34th Guam Legislature
In January, Senator Rodriguez officially announced his bid for the Governor of Guam, selecting former educator and military veteran David Cruz Jr. as his running mate.
Rodriguez's running mate, David Cruz Jr., faced challenges in his bid for Lt. Governor due to an employment contract with the Guam Department of Education. Laws on Guam prohibit government employees from running for public office. Cruz was fired by the Department of Education by late June 2018, after serving for years as an Air Force Junior Reserve Officer Training Corps instructor at the John F. Kennedy High School.

Results

General election
The general elections were held on Tuesday, November 6, 2018. Democratic candidate Lou Leon Guerrero garnered 18,081 votes against Ray Tenorio's 9,419 votes. Guam law requires gubernatorial candidates to attain more than 50% of the total votes to be elected governor. Leon Guerrero passed the necessary threshold by a razor-thin margin, winning the election with 50.7% of the vote against Tenorio's 26.41% and Aguon's 22.81%.

Results

References

External links
Official campaign websites
Ray Tenorio (R) for Governor

Gubernatorial election
Guam
Guam